The Painted Trail is a 1928 American silent Western film directed by J.P. McGowan and starring Buddy Roosevelt, Betty Baker and Leon De La Mothe.

Cast
 Buddy Roosevelt as Blaze Marshall 
 Betty Baker as Betty Winters 
 Leon De La Mothe as Bluff Gunter 
 Lafe McKee as Dan Winters 
 Tom Bay as Badger James

References

Bibliography
 Langman, Larry. A Guide to Silent Westerns. Greenwood Publishing Group, 1992.

External links
 

1928 films
1928 Western (genre) films
Films directed by J. P. McGowan
American black-and-white films
Rayart Pictures films
Silent American Western (genre) films
1920s English-language films
1920s American films